Julian Day may refer to:

 Julian day, a continuous sequential count of days since day 0 at the beginning of the Julian Period on Monday, proleptic Julian calendar
 Julian C. Day (born 1952), American corporate executive
 Julian R. Day, author, computer project manager and charity fundraiser
 Calendar Man, a DC Comics supervillain, whose real name is Julian Gregory Day
 Julian Day (artist), broadcaster, artist and composer